Keri Lynn Ingle (born July 11, 1984) is a Democratic member of the Missouri General Assembly representing the State's 35th House district.

Career
Rep. Ingle earned a BA in Criminal Justice from the University of Central Oklahoma, and a Masters in Social Work from the University of Kansas. Rep. Ingle is a Licensed Master Social Worker in Missouri and Kansas. Rep. Ingle has worked in child welfare as the adoption specialist for the Jackson County Children’s Division, as well as in schools, hospitals, and mental health facilities. 

Ingle won the election on 6 November 2018 from the platform of Democratic Party. She secured 53% of the vote while her closest rival Republican Tom Lovell secured 47%.

She was the Democratic (thus minority) whip in the Missouri house.

Ingle was re-elected on 3 November 2020 from the platform of Democratic Party. She secured 54.5% of the vote while her closet rival Republican Sean Smith secured 45.5%.

Electoral History 
 Keri Ingle has not yet had any opponents in the Democratic Party, thus getting nominated each time by default.

References

1984 births
21st-century American politicians
21st-century American women politicians
Living people
Ingle, Keri
Women state legislators in Missouri